Thermite is the name of two fictional characters appearing in American comic books published by Marvel Comics.

Publication history
The first Thermite first appeared in Squadron Supreme #10 (June 1986), and was created Mark Gruenwald and Paul Ryan.

Fictional character biography

Earth-712 Thermite

Thermite was recruited by Nighthawk into his Redeemers to oppose his former group, the Squadron Supreme. Along with four other members of the Redeemers (Redstone, Moonglow, Inertia, and Haywire), Thermite infiltrated the Squadron and served for about a month before the Redeemers openly opposed the Squadron. He was killed when his regulator pack was damaged in a collision with the Whizzer.

Earth-616 Thermite

The origin of this Thermite has not been revealed before joining the New Enforcers.

When Blood Rose tracked the New Enforcers to their headquarters, Thermite assisted his teammates into attacking Black Rose where he uses his powers to disarm Blood Rose. Spider-Man arrived in his new armor and defeated the New Enforcers members until Thermite was the only one left standing. Thermite managed to destroy Spider-Man's armor, but Spider-Man managed to knock him out with one punch. Thermite and the other members of the New Enforcers were arrested by the police.

Powers and abilities
The Squadron Supreme Thermite could project intense heat from the left side of his body, and intense cold from the right. He needed a regulator pack to control his body temperature at the interface between his two sides of his body.

The Earth-616 version has the same powers.

In other media
The Earth-616 Thermite appears in Spider-Man: Web of Fire. He appears as a member of the New Enforcers.

References

External links
 Thermite (Earth-712) at Marvel.com
 

Characters created by Mark Gruenwald
Comics characters introduced in 1986
Marvel Comics mutates
Squadron Supreme